Operation Sober Popeye (Project Controlled Weather Popeye / Motorpool / Intermediary-Compatriot) was a military cloud-seeding project carried out by the U.S. Air Force during the Vietnam War in 1967–1972. The highly classified program attempted to extend the monsoon season over specific areas of the Ho Chi Minh Trail, in order to disrupt North Vietnamese military supplies by softening road surfaces and causing landslides.

The former U.S. Secretary of Defense, Robert S. McNamara, was aware that there might be objections raised by the international scientific community but said in a memo to the president that such objections had not in the past been a basis for prevention of military activities considered to be in the interests of U.S. national security.

The chemical weather modification program was conducted from Thailand over Cambodia, Laos, and Vietnam and allegedly sponsored by Secretary of State Henry Kissinger and the CIA without the authorization of then Secretary of Defense Melvin Laird, who had categorically denied to Congress that a program for modification of the weather for use as a tactical weapon even existed.

Build up 
A report titled Rainmaking in SEASIA outlines use of lead iodide and silver iodide deployed by aircraft in a program that was developed in California at Naval Air Weapons Station China Lake and tested in Okinawa, Guam, the Philippines, Texas, and Florida in a hurricane study program called Project Stormfury.

Objectives 
Operation Popeye's goal was to increase rainfall in carefully selected areas to deny the Vietnamese enemy, namely military supply trucks, the use of roads by:
 Softening road surfaces 
 Causing landslides along roadways
 Washing out river crossings
 Maintaining saturated soil conditions beyond the normal time span.

Implementation 
The 54th Weather Reconnaissance Squadron carried out the operation using the slogan "make mud, not war." Starting on March 20, 1967, and continuing through every rainy season (March to November) in Southeast Asia until 1972, operational cloud seeding missions were flown. Three C-130 Hercules aircraft and two F-4C Phantom aircraft based at Udon Thani Royal Thai Air Force Base in Thailand flew two sorties per day. The aircraft were officially on weather reconnaissance missions and the aircraft crews as part of their normal duty also generated weather report data. The crews, all from the 54th Weather Reconnaissance Squadron, were rotated into the operation on a regular basis from Guam. Inside the squadron, the rainmaking operations were code-named "Motorpool".

Public revelation 
Reporter Jack Anderson published a story in March 1971 concerning Operation Popeye (though in his column, it was called Intermediary-Compatriot). The name Operation Popeye (Pop Eye) entered the public space through a brief mention in the Pentagon Papers and a July 3, 1972, article in the New York Times.

Current legal status 
Weather modification procedures, when performed to achieve a military end, now fall under the provenance of the Environmental Modification Convention.

See also 
 Project Stormfury
 Weather warfare
 Weather modification
 WC-130 Hercules

Sources 
 Weather Modification Hearing, United States Senate Subcommittee on Oceans and International Environment of the Committee on Foreign Relations, March 20, 1974

Published government documents 
 Keefer, Edward C. Foreign Relations of the United States 1964-1968 Volume XXVII Laos United States Government Printing Office, 1998.

References

External links 
Transcript of the US Senate Hearing on Weather Modification of March 20, 1974
Operation Motorpool Gallery
Dr. Edwin X Berry's 1969 trip to Philippines for Operation Popeye (Berry now at www.climatephysics.com)

Popeye
Popeye
Popeye
Popeye
Weather modification
Climate of Asia
Popeye
Popeye
Popeye
Popeye
Popeye
Popeye
Battles and operations of the Vietnam War in 1967
Battles and operations of the Vietnam War in 1968
Battles and operations of the Vietnam War in 1969
Battles and operations of the Vietnam War in 1970
Battles and operations of the Vietnam War in 1971
Battles and operations of the Vietnam War in 1972